The 1950–51 Football League season was Birmingham City Football Club's 48th in the Football League and their 20th in the Second Division, having been relegated from the First Division in 1949–50. They finished in 4th position in the 22-team division. They entered the 1950–51 FA Cup at the third round proper and reached the semi-final, in which they lost to Blackpool after a replay.

Twenty-two players made at least one appearance in nationally organised competitive football during the season, and there were thirteen different goalscorers. Goalkeeper Gil Merrick, full-back Arthur Atkins and winger Johnny Berry were ever-present in the 48-game season, and Cyril Trigg was the leading goalscorer with 19 goals, of which 17 came in league matches.

As part of the Festival of Britain, friendly matches were arranged at the end of this season between British clubs and teams from other parts of the British Isles and from continental Europe. Birmingham played in four such matches, against teams from Scotland, Ireland and Yugoslavia.

Football League Second Division

Note that not all teams completed their playing season on the same day. Birmingham were in third position after their last game of the season, on 28 April, but by the time the last game was played, on 5 May, they had been overtaken by Cardiff City and finished fourth, three points behind the promotion places.

League table (part)

FA Cup

Birmingham beat Manchester City, Bristol City, and First Division teams Derby County and Manchester United, without needing a replay and while conceding only one goal, to reach the semi-final, in which they faced another First Division team, Blackpool. The Times suggested that the fixture, "as always when Matthews plays, will present the problem of how to smother the greatest player in the history of English football", warning that "to smother Matthews—should they even succeed—is not to smother Blackpool." Supporters queued all night for tickets; the 20,000 allocation sold out within two hours. In addition to several special trains, the supporters' club chartered 60 coaches to travel to Maine Road, Manchester, where touts were offering tickets for sale at four times face value.

Blackpool were the class team, but "Birmingham, with their fiery, quick tackling, their spirit and the snapping up of stray chances, have swept class aside before now." Though failing to sweep Blackpool aside, they did stop them scoring, combatting the attacking threat by switching the pacy Jack Badham to the left to man-mark Matthews and using the other defenders, among whom Arthur Atkins stood out, to cut out his crosses. With two minutes left, Jackie Stewart's "terrific left-foot shot struck a post, then passed out, with thousands of horrified Blackpool supporters on the verge of doing likewise."

In the replay, at Goodison Park in front of a 70,000 crowd, "the greatest mystery of all was why the Blackpool inside forwards did not run up a total of five or six goals in the opening hour—to put it conservatively", with Matthews in "his finest form". They scored twice, but within a minute of the second, Bill Smith pulled one back after Johnny Berry's corner rebounded from a post. In the remainder of the match, Birmingham rallied, with shots from all parts; "Blackpool weathered the storm they had brought upon themselves, but how gallantly had Birmingham died."

Festival of Britain
As part of the Festival of Britain, friendly matches were arranged at the end of this season between British clubs and against teams from continental Europe. Birmingham played in four such matches, against teams from Scotland, Ireland and Yugoslavia.

Appearances and goals

Players with name struck through and marked  left the club during the playing season.

See also
Birmingham City F.C. seasons

References
General
 
 
 Source for match dates and results: 
 Source for lineups, appearances, goalscorers and attendances: Matthews (2010), Complete Record, pp. 336–37.
 Source for kit: "Birmingham City". Historical Football Kits. Retrieved 22 May 2018.

Specific

Birmingham City F.C. seasons
Birmingham City